Garm Khani or Garamkhani may refer to:
 Garamkhani, Gilan
 Garm Khani, Lorestan
 Garm Khani, Mazandaran